Trávníček or Travnicek is a Czech surname, a diminutive form from the Slavic word Travnik.

Variant forms
Variants include Trávníček, Travnicek, Travniczek, Trawniczek, Travnitschek, Trawnitschek, Trawnitscheck, Travnizek, Trawnizek and Travnicsek.

Notable people with this name
 Cornelia Travnicek (born 1987), Austrian writer, (see German article)
 František Trávníček (1888–1961), Czech linguist, (see Czech article)
 Jiří Trávníček, Czech bohemist
 Josef Trávníček (Josef Travnicek, Joseph Trávníček), also Germanised 
 Josef Trauneck (Joseph Trauneck) (1898–1975), a Czech-Austrian musician
 Josef Jan Trávníček (see Czech article)
 Michal Trávníček, a Czech ice hockey player
 Mojmír Trávníček, Czech literary historian, critic and editor, (see Czech article)
 Pavel Trávníček (born 1950), Czech actor, (see German article)
An alter ego of the post-war Austrian cabaret artist Helmut Qualtinger

Place name 
 Trávníček (Bílá), a place nearby Liberec, Czech Republic (see Czech article)

References 

Czech-language surnames